Annals of Internal Medicine is an academic medical journal published by the American College of Physicians (ACP). It is one of the most widely cited and influential specialty medical journals in the world. Annals publishes content relevant to the field of internal medicine and related sub-specialties. Annals publishes a wide variety of original research, review articles, practice guidelines, and commentary relevant to clinical practice, health care delivery, public health, health care policy, medical education, ethics, and research methodology. In addition, the journal publishes personal narratives that convey the feeling and the art of medicine. Selected articles in the journal are open access; these include patient oriented content and Clinical Guidelines (and related reviews).

Impact factor 
The most recent (2021) Impact Factor for Annals of Internal Medicine is 51.598 (Clarivate Analytics). According to the new 2021 Journal Citations Reports from Clarivate Analytics, Annals is the highest cited and ranked internal medicine journal in the category of Medicine, General and Internal.

Abstracting and indexing 
The journal is abstracted and indexed in:

History 
Annals of Internal Medicine was established in 1927. New content is published online weekly and a hard copy is published on the third Tuesday of each month. ACP previously produced two other journals. The Annals of Medicine was established in 1920 was discontinued by its publisher after a short run. The Annals of Clinical Medicine was renamed to the current title when the ACP took direct control and became publisher. Editors-in-chief have included Aldred Scott Warthin, Carl Weller, Maurice Pincoffs (1933–1960), Paul Clough, J. Russell Elkington (1960–1971), Edward Huth, Robert and Suzanne Fletcher, Frank Davidoff and Harold C. Sox.  Peer review was introduced by Elkington. The current editor-in-chief is Christine Laine, MD, MPH, FACP. In May 2008, ACP Journal Club was merged into Annals of Internal Medicine as a monthly feature; previously it was a separate bimonthly journal.

References

Delayed open access journals
Publications established in 1927
Internal medicine journals
Biweekly journals
English-language journals
Academic journals published by learned and professional societies